The Seward Journal is a weekly newspaper covering issues in the City of Seward, Alaska. The paper is distributed by home delivery subscription and is sold in grocery stores, coffee houses and hotels around Seward.

External links
 

2010 establishments in Alaska
Newspapers published in Alaska
Publications established in 2010
Seward, Alaska